Chignahuapan Municipality  is a town and municipality in Puebla in south-eastern Mexico.
The municipality is the location of many touristic places very well known all over the state such as the Basilica of the Immaculate Conception, which is the biggest figure of the virgin Mary in Latin America, and also, Las Aguas Termales de Chignahuapan (thermal waters).

The main economy of Chignahuapan is making Christmas baubles. 

The BUAP has a Regional Section there.

References

Municipalities of Puebla
Pueblos Mágicos